Kunchukokhabl is a rural locality (an aul) in Dzhidzhikhablskoye Rural Settlement of Teuchezhsky District, the Republic of Adygea, Russia. The population was 519 as of 2018. There are 10 streets.

Geography 
The aul is on the shore of the Gulf of Krasnodar reservoir, 19 km northeast of Ponezhukay (the district's administrative centre) by road. Gorodskoy is the nearest rural locality.

Ethnicity 
The aul is inhabited by Circassians.

References 

Rural localities in Teuchezhsky District